The FIDM Museum & Library, Inc. was founded in 1978 to serve the Fashion Institute of Design & Merchandising (FIDM) and the community. Since January 1999, the museum's operations have been separate from the Library and School in order to offer more specialized care and attention to the specific needs of a costume collection. Museum-trained personnel have also been added to the staff to support and aide any and all visitors that visit the different exhibits offered.

Contents
The museum is located on the ground floor of the Los Angeles campus of the Fashion Institute of Design and Merchandising, and houses a collection of over 12,000 costumes, accessories and textiles from the 18th century through the present day, including film and theater costume.  The FIDM Museum also houses the early Hollywood Costume Collection on loan from the City of Los Angeles, Department of Parks and Recreation. It presents the annual Motion Picture Costume Design exhibition at the galleries. Exhibits are showcased for limited time.

The Annette Green Perfume Museum is in permanent residence at the FIDM Museum & Galleries, located on the 2nd floor.

References

Sources
 
External links

 Fidm site map. fidm.edu.

Museums in Los Angeles
Buildings and structures in Downtown Los Angeles
Textile museums in the United States
Industry museums in California
Fashion museums in the United States
Museums established in 1978
1978 establishments in California
Fashion merchandising